Siemens is an unincorporated community in Gogebic County, in the U.S. state of Michigan. It is located halfway between Ironwood and Bessemer along U.S. Route 2.

History
The community was named for Werner von Siemens, a German inventor and industrialist.

References

Unincorporated communities in Gogebic County, Michigan